Cobalt is a chemical element with symbol Co and atomic number 27.

Cobalt may also refer to:

Places 
 Cobalt, Connecticut, United States
 Cobalt, Idaho, United States
 Cobalt, Missouri, United States
 Cobalt, Ontario, Canada

Arts, entertainment, and media

Games
 Cobalt (video game)
 Cobalt WASD

Music
 Cobalt (band), a band from Colorado
 Co-Balt, the second studio album by the band Brute

Other uses in arts, entertainment, and media
"Cobalt" (Fear the Walking Dead), an episode named after a fictional evacuation operation
 Cobalt (magazine), a shōjo fiction magazine published in Japan
 Martin Cobalt, a pseudonym of the writer William Mayne

Computing and technology 
 Cobalt (CAD program)
 Cobalt, version 6.0 of Palm OS
 COBALT, the radio correlator for LOFAR
 Cobalt Networks, a computer hardware company, or computer server appliances made by that company:
 Cobalt RaQ 
 Cobalt Qube
 Open Cobalt, the open source virtual world browser and construction toolkit
 NASA's CoOperative Blending of Autonomous Landing Technologies (COBALT) project

Other uses 
 Chevrolet Cobalt, an automobile
 Cobalt Air, a Cypriot airline
 Cobalt blue, a color
 Cobalt Park, a British business park
 OTs-01 Kobalt, a 9mm revolver
 Cobalt Boats

See also 

 
 
 CO (disambiguation)
 COBOL